Damir Mehić (born 18 April 1987) is a Bosnian-born Swedish footballer who plays as a goalkeeper.

References

External links

1987 births
Living people
Association football goalkeepers
BK Häcken players
Jönköpings Södra IF players
GAIS players
Östers IF players
Allsvenskan players
Swedish footballers
Superettan players